The stream brown frog or Napparagawa frog (Rana sakuraii) is a species of frog in the family Ranidae.  It is endemic to Japan.

Its natural habitats are temperate forests and rivers.

References

Endemic amphibians of Japan
Rana (genus)
Taxonomy articles created by Polbot
Amphibians described in 1990